Tamogitake may refer to:
 Pleurotus ostreatus, also known as the "Oyster Mushroom"
 Pleurotus citrinopileatus, also known as the "Golden Oyster Mushroom"